The Party for the Commonwealth of Canada (also known as the Party for the Republic of Canada) fielded twenty-eight candidates in the 1985 Quebec provincial election, none of whom were elected. This party was the Canadian branch of Lyndon LaRouche's movement. Information about the party candidates may be found on this page.

Electoral divisions

Dorion: M. Luisa Grau
M. Luisa Grau received 56 votes (0.23%), finishing ninth against Liberal candidate Violette Trépanier.

Richelieu: Jean-Paul Belley
Jean-Paul Belley received 72 votes (0.23%), finishing sixth against Liberal candidate Albert Khelfa. He was sixty-eight years old in 1998.

References

Candidates in Quebec provincial elections
Quebec 1985